"Karla with a K" is a song by Philadelphia band The Hooters from their 1987 album One Way Home. The single charted in the UK, reaching number 81 on January 23, 1988, and was on the chart for 4 weeks. In the United States, the 12" single was released as a promo. The song plays at 101 BPM in 4/4 time signature. The song has later appeared on some of the band's compilation albums such as Definitive Collection in 1995 and Playlist: The Very Best of the Hooters in 2012.

Charts

References

The Hooters songs
1987 songs
Columbia Records singles